The 2003 FINA Men's Water Polo World League was the second edition of the annual event, organised by the world's governing body in aquatics, the FINA. After two preliminary rounds, held in São Paulo, Brazil and Budapest, Hungary, the Super Final was held in New York, United States from August 22 to August 24, 2003.

Preliminary round

Group A
Held in São Paulo, Brazil

June 27, 2003

June 28, 2003

June 29, 2003

Group B
Held in Budapest, Hungary

June 27, 2003

June 28, 2003

June 29, 2003

Super Final

Play-Offs
August 22, 2003

Semi-finals
August 23, 2003

Fifth-place match
August 23, 2003

Bronze-medal match
August 24, 2003

Gold-medal match
August 24, 2003

Final ranking

Individual awards
Most Valuable Player

Best Goalkeeper

Statistics
Total goals: 331
Total matches: 19
Goals per match: 17.4
Total of scorers: 83

References

 FINA
Sports123

2003
W
International water polo competitions hosted by the United States
W